Péter Pál Pálfy (Debrecen, 23 August 1955) is a Hungarian mathematician, working in algebra, more precisely in group theory and universal algebra. He serves as the director of the Alfréd Rényi Institute of Mathematics of the Hungarian Academy of Sciences since 2006.

Career 
Pálfy graduated from Eötvös University, Budapest in 1978 and started working at the Alfréd Rényi Institute of Mathematics of the Hungarian Academy of Sciences. He was deputy director of the Institute from 1991 to 1997. From 2000 to 2005 he had a full-time professorship at Eötvös University. In 2006, he returned to the Alfréd Rényi Institute of Mathematics as director holding this position ever since as well as a part-time professorship at Eötvös University.

Pálfy obtained his DSc degree in 1997.  He was elected a corresponding member of the Hungarian Academy of Sciences in 2004 and full member in 2010.

References

External links 
 Personal webpage, Alfréd Rényi Institute of Mathematics

20th-century Hungarian mathematicians
21st-century Hungarian mathematicians
Living people
1955 births